Haunted Nights is a fiction show telecasted on Sahara One from 20 February 2012. This show is directed by Vikram Bhatt. Some of the actors who acted in the show are Rashami Desai, Shilpa Saklani, Manini Mishra, Sakshi Tanwar, Gautami Kapoor, Amit Sareen Priya Marathe and male actors like Manish Gandhi and Nivin Ramani. The show is produced by The Entertainment Hub which also produced Piya Ka Ghar Pyaara Lage on Sahara One.

List of series

References

External links
 Haunted Nights' Series on YouTube

Indian television series